Hyundai Asan is an arm of the South Korean conglomerate Hyundai Group and a major investor in North Korea. The company manages a number of projects, including the resort at the Mount Kumgang Tourist Region and road/rail building operations. It is also involved in the Kaesong Industrial Park project.

Hyundai split
The family-controlled Hyundai Group, which used to be South Korea's largest Chaebol, was split into three sub-groups after the Asian financial crisis. Chung Mong-hun was involved in a power struggle with his elder brother, Chung Mong-koo, who heads another part of the Hyundai Group, the automaker Hyundai Motor Company.

Accusations of corruption

Hyundai Asan has faced accusations of being a vehicle for illegally transferring US$100 million to North Korea from the government of former South Korean President Kim Dae-jung. The money was supposedly used to persuade North Korean leader Kim Jong-il to attend the inter-Korean summit in 2000. Hyundai Asan is building an industrial park, cross-border roads and railway lines in North Korea. The delay of the projects, due to political difficulties, put severe financial strains on the company. The head of Hyundai Asan, Chung Mong-hun, faced corruption and embezzlement charges. Chung was tried on charges of manipulating company accounting records to hide the secret transfers and embezzling more than twelve million dollars of company funds to pay bribes. On August 4, 2003 he committed suicide by leaping from his 12th floor office.

Recent developments
Kaesong Industrial Park is being developed in North Korea, with the planned participation of 250 South Korean companies, employing 100,000 North Koreans, by 2007. Three companies started operations in March 2005, in the park's pilot phase.

See also

Division of Korea
Economy of North Korea
Hyundai Group
Chaebol
North-South presidential summit corruption allegations
Chung Ju-yung

References

External links
 Hyundai Asan Homepage  

Asan
Service companies of South Korea
North Korea–South Korea relations
Economy of North Korea